Cornelia Cnoop or Cnopp (born 1450) was an Netherlandish miniature painter.  A painting attributed to her hand was exhibited in 1902 in Bruges during the Exposition des primitifs flamands à Bruges, in the Provinciaal Hof as catalog number 130.

She was married to the painter and manuscript illuminator Gerard David.

She was born in Bruges as the daughter of the goldsmith Jacob Cnoop de Jongere and Kathelijne uter Vorst. Her father was a dean of the goldsmiths' guild. She married Gerard David in 1497. They had a daughter Barbara. In 1509 her husband donated a Virgo inter Virgines to the church of the Carmelites, that included a self-portrait on the left and a portrait of his wife on the right.

References

External links
 Cornelia Cnoop in Bénézit

1450 births
1500s deaths
Dutch women painters